George Alfred McLeod (13 September 1871 – 27 June 1921) was an Australian rules footballer who played for St Kilda during the early years of the Victorian Football League (VFL).

References 

1871 births
Australian rules footballers from Victoria (Australia)
St Kilda Football Club players
1921 deaths